Oliver Szolnoki (born 6 May 1997) is a Hungarian pool player. A regular on the Euro Tour, Szolnoki reached the quarter-finals of the 2019 Veldhoven Open. He reached a high ranking of 14th on the Tour in 2019.

Szolnoki won four medals at the World Pool-Billiard Association world championship events, reaching the final of the under-16s eight-ball event in 2013, and the youth nine-ball event in 2019.

Titles
 2021 Diamond Open 9-Ball Division

References

External links

Hungarian pool players
Living people
1997 births